Cooperstown Municipal Airport  is a public airport located two miles (3.2 km) southeast of the central business district of Cooperstown, in Griggs County, North Dakota, United States. It is owned by the Cooperstown Airport Authority.

Facilities and aircraft

For the 12-month period ending October 27, 1999, the airport had 2,100 aircraft operations: 86% general aviation and 14% air taxi.

References

External links

Airports in North Dakota
Buildings and structures in Griggs County, North Dakota
Transportation in Griggs County, North Dakota